Lawrence Fuller (January 28, 1923 – April 6, 2005) was an American football running back in the National Football League for the Washington Redskins and the Chicago Cardinals.  He did not attend college.

External links
NFL.com player page

1923 births
2005 deaths
People from Franklin County, New York
Players of American football from New York (state)
American football running backs
Washington Redskins players
Chicago Cardinals players